Augarde is a surname. Notable people with the surname include: 

Adrienne Augarde (1882–1913), English actress and singer
Amy Augarde (1868–1959), English actress and singer
 (1908–2006), French politician
Steve Augarde (born 1950), British author and artist